John P. Schneider (born February 14, 1980) is an American professional baseball coach who is the manager of the Toronto Blue Jays of Major League Baseball (MLB). He became a coach for the Blue Jays in 2019 and became interim manager on July 13, 2022. After the 2022 season, the Blue Jays hired him as their permanent manager. Prior to coaching, Schneider played six seasons as a catcher in the Blue Jays minor league organization.

Playing career
Born in Princeton, New Jersey and raised in Lawrence Township, Mercer County, New Jersey, Schneider graduated from Lawrence High School in 1998. He attended the University of Delaware and played college baseball for the Fightin' Blue Hens. In three seasons, he batted .306 with 23 home runs and 139 runs batted in (RBIs). In 2001, he played collegiate summer baseball with the Chatham A's of the Cape Cod Baseball League. Schneider was selected by the Detroit Tigers in the 24th round of the 2001 Major League Baseball draft, but did not sign, and was chosen by the Toronto Blue Jays in the 13th round of the 2002 draft. He was assigned to the Short Season-A Auburn Doubledays for the 2002 season, and hit .240 with two home runs and 11 RBIs. The following year, Schneider played for the Class-A Charleston AlleyCats and the Triple-A Syracuse SkyChiefs, and batted .188 with 14 RBIs in 59 games.

Schneider played the entire 2004 season with the Advanced-A Dunedin Blue Jays, appearing in 58 games and batting .206 with six home runs and 28 RBIs. With Dunedin in 2005, he hit .321 in 22 games and was promoted back to Triple-A Syracuse, but struggled to a .179 average through 34 games with the SkyChiefs. Schneider played at three different minor league levels in 2006, including the New Hampshire Fisher Cats, but was limited to 34 games due to back surgery. He retired after the 2007 minor league season, due to three concussions suffered during the season.

Coaching career
After retiring as a player, Schneider was hired by the Blue Jays organization as a catching instructor. In 2008, he became the manager of the Rookie-level Gulf Coast League Blue Jays. Schneider was promoted to manage the Short Season-A Vancouver Canadians on December 1, 2010, and became the youngest manager in team history at 30 years of age. In 2011, he managed the Canadians, but took a personal leave of absence during the season. Vancouver won the league's championship in 2011. Schneider returned to the Gulf Coast League in 2013, and then went back to managing Vancouver in 2014 and 2015. In 2016, he managed the Class-A Lansing Lugnuts, and in 2017, won the first Florida State League championship in the 33-year history of the Dunedin Blue Jays. On January 10, 2018, Schnieder was promoted to manage the New Hampshire Fisher Cats, and led the team to an Eastern League championship. At the end of the season, he was named the Eastern League Manager of the Year.

The Blue Jays promoted Schneider to their major league coaching staff before the 2019 season to work with Blue Jays catchers. He pitched to Vladimir Guerrero Jr. during the 2019 Major League Baseball Home Run Derby. The Blue Jays promoted Schneider to become their bench coach for the 2022 season.

On July 13, 2022, the Blue Jays fired Charlie Montoyo as their manager and named Schneider their interim manager for the remainder of the season. He won his first game as manager that night. Schneider led the Blue Jays to a  record and to the 2022 American League Wild Card Series as the Blue Jays manager in 2022. On October 21, 2022, the Blue Jays hired Schneider as their full-time manager, and signing him to a three-year contract with an option for a fourth season.

Managerial record

Personal life

Schneider has two siblings. His older brother Matt played basketball for Muhlenberg University. His younger brother Kevin played baseball at Monmouth University. His parents David & Cathy live in New Jersey.

Schneider married his wife Jessy in 2015. They have two sons; Gunner, born in 2016, and Grayson, born in 2018.

References

External links

1980 births
Living people
American expatriate baseball people in Canada
Auburn Doubledays players
Baseball catchers
Baseball coaches from New Jersey
Baseball players from New Jersey
Charleston AlleyCats players
Chatham Anglers players
Delaware Fightin' Blue Hens baseball players
Dunedin Blue Jays players
Lawrence High School (New Jersey) alumni
Minor league baseball managers
New Hampshire Fisher Cats players
People from Lawrence Township, Mercer County, New Jersey
People from Princeton, New Jersey
Sportspeople from Mercer County, New Jersey
Syracuse SkyChiefs players
Toronto Blue Jays coaches